Generations In Jazz (often abbreviated to GIJ) is an annual weekend jazz festival held in Mount Gambier, South Australia. It is held in May and brings together many young jazz musicians from all over Australia and New Zealand.

History 
The Generations in Jazz Festival was first held in 1987. The festival's genesis dates from 1982 when three young musicians performed a tribute for their fathers and grandfathers. Nowadays, an estimated 5,200 young people in bands from all around Australia and New Zealand make their way to Mount Gambier. Professional musicians who have taught, performed or judged at the festival include James Morrison, Daryl Somers, Ross Irwin, James Muller, Wycliffe Gordon, Graeme Lyall, Gordon Goodwin and his Big Phat Band, Take 6, and Jeff Clayton.

The World's Largest Modular Tent 

The World's Largest Modular Tent is the home of an annual event held in Mount Gambier, South Australia, from May 1 to May 3, 2020. The tent is approximately 64 metres wide and 84 metres long, reaching heights of up to 25 metres; it requires a crew of up to 18 people to assemble it and can hold up to 11,000 people.  Generations in Jazz is hosted by James Morrison.
Each year, James invites guest artists to perform in a variety of concerts held in the tent. 
The event sees about 5200 students performing each year and 200 buses transport them to and from the venue.

While the World's Largest Modular Tent supplies seating for the concerts and division 1 performances, there are a variety of other, smaller tents that hold performances and cater for food. 
Adjudicators are often on stage during one or more of the concerts held in the World's Largest Modular Tent and they compose the set piece for each division to play.

Awards and scholarships

James Morrison Jazz Scholarship 
The 'James Morrison Jazz Scholarship' is open to solo instrumentalists. Six finalists are judged during the Generations In Jazz weekend. The winner receives $10,000 to assist in the development of their career.

Generations in Jazz Vocal Scholarship 
The winner will receive $5,000 to assist in the development of their career.

City of Mt. Gambier National Big Bands 
The Big Band part of the festival invites secondary school big bands from around Australia and New Zealand to compete for prize money of up to $7000 (Division 1). Bands compete for prize money in one of four divisions and stand-out musicians can be rewarded with a place in their division's "Superband". Several improvising musicians in Division 1 are nominated as potential "Future Finalists" of the James Morrison Jazz Scholarship, and one is selected to win $3,500 to assist their musical education. Divisions 1 and 2 superbands and future finalists all play at the Festival Finale. Division 5 (first introduced in 2013) bands are adjudicated only, though one band is selected to win an encouragement award.

James Morrison Academy of Music
The James Morrison Academy of Music (previously known as the Generations In Jazz Academy) was a Jazz Performance course run by Graeme Lyall catering to young musicians. It was run in Mount Gambier, South Australia, and offered a one-year Diploma of Music through its affiliation with the University of South Australia. The course covered aural, theory, arranging and improvisation. All students rehearsed together as a large ensemble for 90 minutes, Monday to Friday. The ensemble had the opportunity to play with James Morrison at the Generations in Jazz Festival. In 2015 the academy moved into the Old Town Hall in Mt. Gambier.

The Academy had its final teaching year in 2021, since opting to operate as a 'pop-up' academy.  The closure is speculated to be due to a lack of funding and public displeasure over James Morrison's support of a sexual assault perpetrator.

2020 Cancellation
The 2020 Generations in Jazz competition was cancelled due to the COVID-19 global pandemic. In a statement released on the 13th of March, the board outlined their reasoning and their disappointment at having to cancel the event. "Of paramount importance to the Board is the safety and welfare of both the participants and the local community. The Board cannot offer any certainty to deliver the level of Risk management actions required to protect all involved under these current circumstances. It is a very disappointing time for all and we acknowledge the work and dedication of the students, Music Directors and auxilliary [sic] support."

The competition was also cancelled in 2021.

Results and history
2019

2018

2017

2016

2015

2014 

2013 

2012

2011

2010 

2009

List of set pieces
2018

2017

2015

2014

References

External links
 Official site
 James Morrison Academy

Jazz festivals in Australia
Music festivals established in 1987